Heterobathmia pseuderiocrania, the southern beech moth, is a species of moth belonging to the family Heterobathmiidae. It was first described by Niels Peder Kristensen and Ebbe Nielsen in 1979. It is found in temperate South America, including Argentina.

The mouthparts are primitive and well adapted for collecting and grinding pollen of Nothofagus species.  The five piece maxillary palps display specialized structures which enable the collection of pollen.

References

Moths described in 1979
Moths of South America
Fauna of Argentina
Heterobathmiina
Taxa named by Ebbe Nielsen